Korver is a Dutch surname.  The similar name Körver is a German surname.  Notable people with the surname include:

Frans Körver (born 1937), Dutch footballer
Kelvin Korver (born 1949), American football player
Kyle Korver (born 1981), American basketball player
Paul Korver (born 1971), American filmmaker
Simon Korver (born 1940), Dutch sailor

See also
Bok de Korver (1883–1957), Dutch footballer

Dutch-language surnames